Kanye West (born 1977) is an American rapper, record producer and fashion designer. 

Kanye West may also refer to:

 "Kanye West", a song by Atmosphere from the 2014 album Southsiders
 "Kanye West", a song by Young Thug from the 2016 mixtape Jeffery

See also
 
 
 Kanye (disambiguation)
 West (disambiguation)